Raúl Cicero (born 31 December 1926) is a Mexican fencer. He competed in the individual foil event at the 1960 Summer Olympics.

References

External links
 

1926 births
Living people
Mexican male foil fencers
Olympic fencers of Mexico
Fencers at the 1960 Summer Olympics